Black Sunday is the second studio album by American hip hop group Cypress Hill. It was released on July 20, 1993 by Ruffhouse and Columbia Records. The album proved to be a massive success just like the first album Cypress Hill. The album debuted at #1 on the US Billboard 200, selling 261,000 copies in its first week of sales and became the highest Soundscan recording for a hip hop group at the time. Also, with their first album (Cypress Hill) still in the charts, they became the first hip hop group ever to have 2 albums in the Top 10 of the US Billboard 200 at the same time. The album went Triple platinum in the U.S. with 3.4 million units sold.

As Cypress Hill advocates for medical and recreational use of cannabis the booklet of the album contains 19 facts about the history of hemp and the positive attributes of cannabis.

Background
The first single, "Insane in the Brain", became a crossover hit, starting a following among rock and hip hop audiences. A clean censored version of the album was also made which removes the song "A to the K". The song "Hand on the Glock" is a re-recorded version of the track "Hand on the Pump" from the debut album Cypress Hill.

Reception

The single "I Ain't Goin' Out Like That" was nominated for the Grammy Award's Best Rap Performance of the year category.

Rolling Stone - 4 stars - Excellent - "…it's the Cypress combo of stark grooves and cinematic gangsta fairy tales that allows them to rule the streets, a formula not messed with on Black Sunday…"

The Source - 4 stars - Excellent - "…a darker sequel…this album is definitely worth buying as it easily rips the frame out of all those Cypress bandwagon jumpers…"

 Included in Q magazine's list of the 50 Best Albums of 1993.
 Ranked #35 in Melody Makers list of "The Albums of the Year" for 1993.
 Ranked #29 in the Village Voices 1993 Pazz & Jop Critics Poll.
 Ranked #8 in New Musical Expresss list of "The Top 50 LPs of 1993".

Track listing
All tracks produced by DJ Muggs, except track 2 produced by T-Ray.

Later repressings have a fade at the end of "Insane In The Brain" due to sample clearance issues, & "Lock Down" is omitted.

Personnel

Cypress Hill
B-Real – vocals
Sen Dog – vocals
DJ Muggs – turntables, arrangements, executive production, programming and mixing

Additional personnel
T-Ray – producer ("I Ain't Goin' Out Like That")
John Gamble – engineer
Andy Kravitz – engineer
Manuel Lecuona – engineer
Jason Roberts – engineer
Chris Shaw – engineer, mixing
Joe Nicolo – executive producer, mixing
Chris Schwartz – executive producer
Jay Papke – design
Anthony Artiaga – photography

Charts

Weekly charts

Year-end charts

Singles

Certifications

See also
List of number-one albums of 1993 (U.S.)
List of number-one R&B albums of 1993 (U.S.)

References

External links

Cypress Hill albums
1993 albums
Columbia Records albums
Albums produced by DJ Muggs
Ruffhouse Records albums
Cannabis music